The 2016 New York Republican presidential primary was held on April 19 in the U.S. state of New York as one of the Republican Party's primaries ahead of the 2016 presidential election.

Donald Trump won his home state with 59% of the vote and picked up 89 pledged delegates. He won over all age groups, income levels and political ideologies, with most voters saying they want a candidate who "can bring change" and "tells it like it is". Most voters supported Trump's proposed ban on Muslim immigration to the United States.

The Democratic Party also held their own New York primary on the same day which was won by Hillary Clinton. Apart from that, no other primaries were scheduled for that day by either party.

The state of the campaign

National situation
Despite an early victory by Ted Cruz in the Iowa caucuses, Donald Trump was seen as making steady progress towards the Republican nomination at the time. Trump was victorious in 7 of the contests on March 1, with Cruz seen as the only viable threat to Trump after victories in his home state of Texas and 2 other March 1 contests. Marco Rubio performed worse than anticipated on March 1, taking only Minnesota. On March 8, two primaries and a caucus were held in Hawaii, Michigan and Mississippi. Despite a poll from American Research Group that showed Kasich leading Trump in Michigan, Trump won all three contests.

On March 15's primaries, Donald Trump took four of the five contests- Florida, Illinois, Missouri and North Carolina. Trump however was defeated in Ohio by John Kasich, losing all 66 of the state's delegates. Marco Rubio suspended his campaign after losing the Florida contest, leaving just Cruz and Kasich in the race to oppose Trump.

On March 22, Trump won the Arizona contest and all of its 58 pledged delegates, while Cruz capitalized on Trump's comments critical of Mitt Romney's Mormon faith to take the state of Utah and its 40 delegates.

The month of April brought several strong performances for Cruz. He capitalized on a weak ground game in the Donald Trump campaign to win the conventions in North Dakota and Colorado, despite criticism from Donald Trump. In addition, Ted Cruz won the valuable Wisconsin primary and with it 36 of the state's 42 delegates. Many considered the probability of a "contested" Republican National Convention as it was considered doubtful that Trump would receive the requisite 1,237 delegates.

New York situation
Being Donald Trump's home state, New York was expected to be one of his strongest states in the primary contests. While Trump himself said that he would be satisfied with only one half of the delegates, most prognosticators said that Trump would have to perform extremely strongly in the state in order to avoid a contested convention. Ted Cruz's attacks in a Fox Business Network primary debate in South Carolina, criticizing Donald Trump for holding what he referred to as "New York values"- meaning the liberal, left leaning values of New York City came under fire as Cruz was campaigning in New York as well. This, combined with Trump's strong performances in the Northeast, especially Massachusetts, meant that Trump was considered a favorite with Kasich as his main challenger.

Opinion polling

Results

Of the 62 counties in the state, Donald Trump won 61, with the one loss being his home county of New York County (Manhattan), where John Kasich won. Trump's strongest showings were in Richmond County (Staten Island), Nassau County, Queens, Suffolk County and Erie County. John Kasich won Manhattan with a plurality and placed a strong second in upstate college areas such as Cortland,  Syracuse and the Capital District area centered around Albany.

Ultimately, Trump was able to get the full slate of delegates in 22 out of 27 congressional districts, due to meeting or exceeding the 50% threshold in each.  Kasich won 2 delegates in the 12th district (Upper East Side Manhattan/Queens), and one each in the 10th (Jewish Manhattan/Brooklyn neighborhoods), 13th (Harlem), 20th (Albany), and 24th (Syracuse) districts.  Ted Cruz won 14.5% of the vote but did not win any delegates.

Republican Primary Results by County

*Note: Blank, Void, and Scattering (BVS) votes include some votes for Former Candidate Ben Carson. Carson vote totals are unavailable in some county canvass returns. Only those available are posted. New York is a Closed primary state, meaning that the turnout is based on Active Republican Voters on April 1, 2016

See also
 2016 New York Democratic presidential primary

References

New York
Republican primary
2016
April 2016 events in the United States